Admiral Warren may refer to:

Frederick Warren (1775–1848), British Royal Navy vice admiral
John Borlase Warren (1753–1822), British Royal Navy admiral
Peter Warren (Royal Navy officer) (1703–1752), British Royal Navy vice admiral
Richard Warren (Royal Navy officer) (1806–1875), British Royal Navy admiral
Samuel Warren (Royal Navy officer) (1769–1839), British Royal Navy rear admiral